Raymond Bowers may refer to:

 R. J. Bowers (born 1974), American football player in the National Football League
 Raymond Bowers (actor), British actor
 Raymond Bowers (writer) (born 1919/20), Australian writer